Botswana competed at the 1988 Summer Olympics in Seoul, South Korea.

Competitors
The following is the list of number of competitors in the Games.

Results by event

Athletics
Men

See also
 Botswana at the 1986 Commonwealth Games
 Botswana at the 1990 Commonwealth Games

References

Official Olympic Reports
sports-reference

Nations at the 1988 Summer Olympics
1988
Olympics